Philippe Lavalette is a Canadian cinematographer, writer and documentary filmmaker from Quebec. He is most noted for his work on the 2012 film Inch'Allah, for which he was a Canadian Screen Award nominee for Best Cinematography at the 1st Canadian Screen Awards in 2013.

His other film credits have included Twilight (La Brunante), Victoria and A Cargo to Africa.

In 2017 he published his debut novel, Petite Madeleine. He has also published La mesure du monde, a memoir of his career in film.

He is the husband of filmmaker Manon Barbeau, and the father of filmmaker and writer Anaïs Barbeau-Lavalette.

References

External links

21st-century Canadian novelists
21st-century Canadian non-fiction writers
Canadian male novelists
Canadian novelists in French
Canadian male non-fiction writers
Canadian memoirists
Canadian non-fiction writers in French
Canadian cinematographers
Canadian documentary film directors
Film directors from Quebec
French Quebecers
Living people
Year of birth missing (living people)